Jamie Brandon (born 5 February 1998) is a Scottish footballer who plays for Livingston as a right-back, midfielder or right winger. Brandon has previously played for Heart of Midlothian and Greenock Morton.

Career

Heart of Midlothian
Brandon began his football career with Rangers at the age of 6, before signing his first professional contract in May 2015. He was released by Rangers in May 2016, before joining Heart of Midlothian alongside fellow youth Rory Currie.

He made his professional debut for Hearts on 21 May 2017, playing from the start in a 2–0 defeat against Celtic at Celtic Park. Having played in every pre-season friendly at the start of the 2017–18 season, his next appearance was in the League Cup against Dunfermline Athletic on 29 July 2017. He had been due to appear as a substitute in the previous game versus Peterhead, however was not allowed to enter the field of play due to an error on the teamsheet.

On 10 January 2022 Brandon was loaned to Scottish Championship club Greenock Morton until the end of the season.

Livingston
On 10 May 2022, Brandon signed a pre-contract agreement to join Livingston on a free transfer upon the expiration of his Hearts contract.

International
Brandon made his debut for the Scotland under-21 team in March 2019.

Career statistics

References

1998 births
Living people
People from Whitburn, West Lothian
Footballers from West Lothian
Scottish footballers
Association football fullbacks
Rangers F.C. players
Heart of Midlothian F.C. players
Greenock Morton F.C. players
Livingston F.C. players
Scottish Professional Football League players
Scotland under-21 international footballers